The 1958 Cincinnati Bearcats football team represented the University of Cincinnati in the Missouri Valley Conference during the 1958 NCAA University Division football season under head coach George Blackburn.

Schedule

References

Cincinnati
Cincinnati Bearcats football seasons
Cincinnati Bearcats football